Count Pierre-Louis-George du Buat (23 April 1734 – 17 October 1809) was a French military engineer who worked on problems in hydraulics and hydrodynamics. He examined the flow of water and came up with a mathematical formulation defining the rate of flow of water through pipes which he published in Principes d’hydraulique, vérifiés par un grand nombre d’expériences faites par ordre du gouvernement.

Du Buat came from a noble family and was born in a manor at Buttenval, Tortisambert in Normandy. He was educated at the Royal School of Engineering in Mézières in 1750 and became a military engineer at the age of 17. He began his first work in the construction of canals of the Lys and the Aa. He became a chief engineer in 1773. In 1786 he established through experiments a relationship between the velocity of flow of water through a pipe of a known radius and inclination which he extended then to flow in open canals. 

u is the average water velocity,
g is the acceleration of gravity,
m is a coefficient depending on the roughness of the banks,
i is the slope of the channel bottom,
l is the width of the bed,
h the depth of the channel.
Du Buat also studied the dependence of viscosity of liquids on temperature. 

Du Buat married the daughter of Gérard Bosquet in 1758 which made him a shareholder of the Compagnie des mines d'Anzin. He left the corps of engineers in 1788 and became a director of the company in 1802.

References

External links 
 Principes d'hydraulique (1786)

1734 births
1809 deaths
Hydraulic engineers
French engineers